Alberk Koç (born 15 February 1997) is a Turkish professional footballer who plays as a left back for TFF First League club Çaykur Rizespor.

Professional career
Koç began his senior career with Menemenspor in the TFF First League, becoming their starting left-back. On 30 January 2020, signed a professional contract with Çaykur Rizespor. Koç made his professional debut with Çaykur Rizespor in a 3-2 Süper Lig win over Kayserispor on 9 July 2020.

References

External links
 
 
 

1997 births
Living people
People from Konak
Turkish footballers
Çaykur Rizespor footballers
Süper Lig players
TFF First League players
TFF Second League players
Association football fullbacks